{{DISPLAYTITLE:C15H14O7}}
The molecular formula C15H14O7 may refer to:

 Epigallocatechin
 Fusarubin, a naphthoquinone antibiotic
 Gallocatechol
 Leucocyanidin, a leucoanthocyanidin
 Melacacidin, a leucoanthocyanidin

Molecular formulas